Stephanie Krisper (born 24 May 1980 in Vienna) is an Austrian lawyer and politician of the NEOS party who has been serving as a member of the Austrian National Council since 2017.

Early life and education
Krisper studied law at the University of Vienna, where she received Master of Law. She defended her PhD thesis at the same university in 2012.

Political career
In the 2017 elections, Krisper gained a seat in the National Council.

In addition to her committee assignments, Krisper has been a member of the Austrian delegation to the Parliamentary Assembly of the Council of Europe since 2020. In this capacity, she has served on the Committee on the Honouring of Obligations and Commitments by Member States of the Council of Europe (Monitoring Committee) (since 2022); the Committee on the Election of Judges to the European Court of Human Rights (since 2020); the Committee on Migration, Refugees and Displaced Persons (since 2020); and the Sub-Committee on Migrant Smuggling and Trafficking in Human Beings (since 2020). On behalf of the Assembly, she authored a 2022 report on safe third countries for asylum seekers.

References

Links
Curriculum Vitae Stephanie Krisper
Dr. Stephanie Krisper

21st-century Austrian lawyers
Members of the National Council (Austria)
1980 births
University of Vienna alumni
21st-century Austrian women politicians
21st-century Austrian politicians
Politicians from Vienna
Austrian women lawyers
Living people
21st-century women lawyers